Studia Leibnitiana is a biannual peer-reviewed academic journal established in 1969. It publishes scholarly articles on philosophy and the history of science of the early modern period, especially related to the German philosopher and polymath Gottfried Wilhelm Leibniz.

The journal is published by Franz Steiner Verlag on behalf of the Gottfried-Wilhelm-Leibniz-Gesellschaft. Studia Leibnitiana publishes articles and book reviews in English, French and German.

See also 
 Outline of Gottfried Wilhelm Leibniz

External links 
 

Philosophy journals
Biannual journals
Publications established in 1969
Multilingual journals
History of science journals
Works about Gottfried Wilhelm Leibniz